Trochocyathus is a genus of corals in the family Caryophylliidae. Fossil species are found as far back as the latest Paleocene in the Dilwyn Formation of Australia, in the late Cretaceous in the Woodbury Formation of New Jersey, and in Suffolk.

Platycyathus is sometimes regarded as a subgenus within Trochocyathus.

Species
 Trochocyathus aithoseptatus Cairns, 1984
 Trochocyathus anglicus Duncan, 1872
 Trochocyathus balanophylloides Bolsche, 1870
 Trochocyathus burchae Cairns, 1984
 Trochocyathus gardineri Vaughan, 1907
 Trochocyathus mauiensis Vaughan, 1907
 Trochocyathus oahensis Vaughan, 1907
 Trochocyathus patelliformis Cairns, 1999
 Trochocyathus rhombocolumna Alcock, 1902
 Trochocyathus wilkinsoni Dennant, 1904

References

Caryophylliidae
Scleractinia genera